The Adana Subregion (Turkish: Adana Alt Bölgesi) (TR62) is a statistical subregion in southern Turkey.

Provinces 
 Adana Province (TR621)
 Mersin Province (TR622)

See also 
 NUTS of Turkey

Sources 
 ESPON Database

External links 
 TURKSTAT 

Statistical subregions of Turkey